This is a list of the Australian species of the family Adelidae. It also acts as an index to the species articles and forms part of the full List of moths of Australia.

Adelinae
Nemophora brachypetala (Meyrick, 1912)
Nemophora laurella (Newman, 1856)
Nemophora opalina (Meyrick, 1912)
Nemophora panaeola (Turner, 1913)
Nemophora polydaedala (Turner, 1913)
Nemophora selasphora (Turner, 1913)
Nemophora sparsella Walker, 1863
Nemophora topazias (Meyrick, 1893)

Nematopogoninae
Ceromitia autoscia (Meyrick, 1906)
Ceromitia iolampra (Turner, 1900)
Ceromitia leptosticta (Turner, 1900)

External links 
Adelidae at Australian Faunal Directory

Australia
Moths of Australia